This is a complete list of episodes of the American reality television series The Simple Life starring Paris Hilton and Nicole Richie. The series included 54 episodes and two specials that aired between December 2, 2003, and August 5, 2007, in the United States.

List of seasons

List of episodes

Season 1 (2003–04)

Season 2: Road Trip (2004)

Season 3: Interns (2005)

Season 4: Till Death Do Us Part (2006)

Season 5: Goes to Camp (2007)

Specials

External links
https://www.google.ca/search?q=The+Simple+Lif0

Simple Life, The